Walter Generati (Solara, Bomporto, 8 September 1913 — Modena, 8 February 2001) was an Italian professional road bicycle racer, who won the third stage in the 1937 Tour de France.

Major results

1937
Torino - Ceriale
Tour de France:
Winner stage 3
Giro d'Italia:
Winner stage 11
6th place overall classification
1938
Giro d'Italia:
Winner stage 4B
6th place overall classification
1940
Giro d'Italia:
Winner stage 7
7th place overall classification

External links 

Official Tour de France results for Walter Generati

Italian male cyclists
1913 births
2001 deaths
Italian Tour de France stage winners
Sportspeople from the Province of Modena
Cyclists from Emilia-Romagna